This is a list of video game publisher companies. A video game publisher may specialize in only publishing games for developers, or may either have in-house development studios or own subsidiary development companies. Some developers may publish their games themselves.

This list includes both active and inactive companies. Active publishers are either run independently or as a subsidiary of another company. Inactive publishers may either be defunct outright or still exist but no longer involved in video game publishing.

See also 
 List of video game developers
 List of indie game developers
 Video game developer
 Video game publisher
 Game development
 Video game industry
 History of video games

References

Publishers

Video Game